Wallflower or Erysimum is a genus of flowering plants.

Wallflower may also refer to:

 Wallflower (people), a shy person

Films
 Wallflower (film), a 1948 American comedy film
 Wallflowers (film), a 1928 American drama film
 The Wall Flower, a 1922 American drama film written and directed by Rupert Hughes

Music

Groups
 Wallflower (band), a 1990s British rock band
 The Wallflowers (British band), a British indie/new wave band formed in 1985
 The Wallflowers, an American rock band formed in 1989

Albums 
 Wallflower (Diana Krall album), 2014
 Wallflower (My Sister's Machine album), 1993 
 Wallflower, an album by Jordan Rakei, 2017
 The Wallflowers (album), by the American band The Wallflowers, 1992

Songs 
 "Wallflower" (Bob Dylan song), 1971
 "Wallflower", by Peter Gabriel from Peter Gabriel, 1982
 "The Wallflower (Dance with Me, Henry)", by Etta James, 1955

Other uses in arts, entertainment, and media 
 Wallflower (comics), a fictional character in the Marvel Comics universe
 "Wallflower" (Fringe), an episode of Fringe
 Wallflowers (short story collection), a collection of short stories by Eliza Robertson
 Wallflowers (web series), an American comedy web series
 The Wallflower (manga), a 2000 Japanese comic by Tomoko Hayakawa, and anime and live-action adaptations